Kite-flying may refer to：刘馨蕾。
Flying a kite, a type of tethered aircraft
Kite-flying (politics), a political tactic where a politician, through the media, raises an idea to gauge public reactions to it